Delancey may refer to:
Delancey (property firm), British property firm

Delancey (also De Lancey and de Lancey) is a surname. Notable people with the surname include:

James De Lancey, British colonial Governor of New York between 1753 and 1760
James De Lancey (disambiguation), other people of that name
Oliver De Lancey (disambiguation), multiple people
Etienne de Lancey (1663-1741), a French nobleman
William Howe De Lancey (1778-1815), Wellington's Chief of Staff at the Battle of Waterloo.

See also
Delancey Street, a street in Manhattan, New York
Delancey Place, a street in Philadelphia, Pennsylvania
Crossing Delancey, a 1988 film
De Lancie (disambiguation)